Alejandro Vélez Williams (born 3 March 1988) is a Panamanian football defender who currently plays for Tauro.

Club career
Nicknamed La Bomba, Vélez started his career at local side Árabe Unido and was loaned out with compatriot Amílcar Henríquez to Costa Rican club Santacruceña in summer 2007 and alongside fellow Panamanian Brunet Hay to Colombian team Cortuluá in summer 2010.

In January 2013, he joined Plaza Amador from Colombian outfit Atlético Huila, for who he had signed a year earlier, only to return to Árabe Unido in summer 2013. In July 2014 he moved to Tauro after a season at Río Abajo.

International career
Vélez made his international debut on January 20, 2010, in a friendly match against Chile. He was sent off. He has, as of August 2015, earned a total of 4 caps, scoring no goals.

Honors

Club
Liga Panameña de Fútbol (1): 2008 (C)
'''Liga Panameña de Fútbol: Apertura 2009 II

References

External links
 

1988 births
Living people
Sportspeople from Colón, Panama
Association football midfielders
Panamanian footballers
Panama international footballers
C.D. Árabe Unido players
Cortuluá footballers
Atlético Huila footballers
C.D. Plaza Amador players
Tauro F.C. players
Panamanian expatriate footballers
Expatriate footballers in Costa Rica
Expatriate footballers in Colombia